Palaeoxyris is the prehistoric shark egg capsule morphotype of the family Hybodontidae with a predominant occurrence in ancient freshwater environments. They comprise a beak, a body and a pedicle, with the beak merging into the body. They display a conspicuous right-handed spiral of ridges around the body, and in some cases, the pedicle. Originally described as plant remains and controversially discussed within the floral kingdom it took decades before their true nature as animal eggs was revealed.

Nearly 30 different Palaeoxyris species are currently known with a stratigraphic range from the Carboniferous to the Cretaceous. One species, P. friessi was described in 2010, from Middle Triassic deposits at Ilsfeld, southern Germany. Another, Palaeoxyris alterna, was described in 2011 from lake deposits of the Middle Triassic Madygen Formation in Kyrgyzstan.

References

Fish trace fossils
Egg fossils
Carboniferous sharks
Permian sharks
Triassic sharks
Jurassic sharks
Cretaceous sharks
Madygen Formation